The Database of Macromolecular Motions is a bioinformatics database and software-as-a-service tool that attempts to
categorize macromolecular motions, sometimes also known as conformational change. It was originally developed by Mark B. Gerstein, Werner Krebs, and Nat Echols in the Molecular Biophysics & Biochemistry Department at Yale University.

Discussion 

Since its introduction in the late 1990s, peer-reviewed papers on the database have received thousands of citations. The database has been mentioned in news articles in major scientific journals, book chapters, and elsewhere.

Users can search the database for a particular motion by either protein name or Protein Data Bank ID number. Typically, however, users will enter the database via the Protein Data Bank, which often provides a hyperlink to the molmovdb entry for proteins found in both databases.

The database includes a web-based tool (the Morph server) which allows non-experts to animate and visualize certain types of protein conformational change through the generation of short movies. This system uses molecular modelling techniques to interpolate the structural changes between two different protein conformers and to generate a set of intermediate structures. A hyperlink pointing to the morph results is then emailed to the user.

The Morph Server was originally primarily a research tool rather than general molecular animation tool, and thus offered only limited user control over rendering, animation parameters, color, and point of view, and the original methods sometimes required a fair amount of CPU time to completion. Since their initial introduction in 1996, the database and associated morph server have undergone development to try to address some of these shortcomings as well as add new features, such as Normal Mode Analysis. Other research grounds have subsequently developed alternative systems, such as MovieMaker from the University of Alberta.

Commercialization 
Bioinformatics vendor DNASTAR has incorporated morphs from the database into its commercial Protean3D product. The connection between DNASTAR and the authors of the database, if any, is not immediately clear.

See also
Database of protein conformational diversity

Notes

References

External links
The Database of Macromolecular Motions (molmovdb)
MovieMaker from the University of Alberta

Biological databases
Cloud applications
Biophysics
Protein classification